Ngurah may refer to:

A. A. Ngurah Oka Ratmadi, the mayor of Badung
Gusti Ngurah Harta, intellectual and leader of the Hindu community in Bali
Gusti Ngurah Made Pemecutan (died 1810), King in Badung in the late 18th century
I Gusti Ngurah Rai (1917–1946), Indonesian National Hero during the Indonesian War of Independence
Ngurah Rai Airport, in southern Bali, 13 km south of Denpasar
Ngurah Rai Stadium, multi-use stadium in Denpasar, Indonesia